Cryptocephalus renatae is a cylindrical leaf beetle belonging to the family Chrysomelidae, subfamily Cryptocephalinae. The species was first described by Davide Sassi in 2001.

They are found mostly in Italy and North Macedonia.

References

 Sassi D. (2001). "Nuove specie del genere Cryptocephalus vicine a Cryptocephalus marginellus (Coleoptera Chrysomelidae)". Memorie della Società entomologica italiana, Genoa. 80: 107–138.

External links
 BioLib
 Culex.biol.uni.wroc.pl
 Fauna Europaea
 Chrysomelidae

Beetles of Europe
Beetles described in 2001
renatae